Aaron Franklin Brink (born November 12, 1974), also known by his stage name Dick Delaware, is an American professional mixed martial artist and pornographic film actor who competes in the Light Heavyweight division. He has competed for King of the Cage, RINGS, UFC and World Extreme Cagefighting. Out of 57 career bouts, only one has gone via decision.

Brink has made several mainstream appearances, including episodes of Intervention and Divorce Court. He portrayed Electro in Spider-Man XXX: A Porn Parody (2011). In 2019, Brink returned to the adult industry after a five-year hiatus.

He is the father of Anderson Lee Aldrich, who is accused of perpetrating the Club Q shooting in November 2022.

Early life
Aaron Brink was born on November 12, 1974, in Newport Beach, California. Raised by his blue-collar father in Huntington Beach, he developed passions for wrestling and surfing. Brink attended Huntington High before being expelled for fighting. From 1989 to 1992, he was in and out of juvenile detention centers on eight occasions.

Brink was arrested and sentenced to serve time for smuggling marijuana from Mexico into the United States. While at the Federal Correctional Institution, Terminal Island Brink spent his days training to fight on a heavy bag. He was released at age 24.

Career
After being released from prison, Brink connected with an old friend who encouraged him to enter mixed martial arts. He made his debut at the West Coast NHB Championships in December 1998, winning three fights via knockout. By 2003, he had fought 24 times, compiling a record of 15-8 (1). He has competed for the Gladiator Challenge promotion where he was Interim Heavyweight Champion and the Bare Knuckle Fighting Championship.

Brink entered the adult film industry under the name "Dick Delaware" after being encouraged by a producer at a party. He shot his first scene in 2002; it was released under the title Cum Drippers 4.

Brink's adult film career was first revealed after he appeared in an episode of the television series Intervention discussing his addiction to methamphetamine. Brink later returned to the adult industry.

Personal life
Brink married Laura Voepel, the daughter of California politician Randy Voepel, in 1999, and divorced her in 2001. Brink is the father of Anderson Lee Aldrich, who is accused of perpetrating the Club Q shooting on November 19–20, 2022. In an interview after the shooting, Brink stated that he was a "conservative Republican" and said that when he learned the shooting was at an LGBTQ bar, he was initially horrified by the possibility that Aldrich might be gay, then relieved to discover that was not the case. The reporter later mentioned that his reaction was not included in the original report, but when Brink learned about the victims, he profusely apologized to the community.

On May 21, 2016, Brink and another man were arrested in Rocklin, California, for attempted burglary and possession of a firearm. Brink was also charged for violation of parole and being under the influence of a controlled substance.

Select appearances

Mixed martial arts record

|-
| Win
| align=center| 29–27 (2)
| Cody Sons
| TKO (punches)
| California Cage Wars 13
| 
| align=center| 1
| align=center| 1:35
| Valley Center, California, United States
|
|-
| Win
| align=center| 28–27 (2)
| William Johnson
| Submission (rear-naked choke)
| Gladiator Challenge: Redemption
| 
| align=center| 1
| align=center| 0:47
| Lincoln, California, United States
| 
|-
| Win
| align=center| 27–27 (2)
| John Rizzo
| Submission (boston crab)
| California Cage Wars 4
| 
| align=center| 1
| align=center| 1:37
| Valley Center, California, United States
| 
|-
| NC
| align=center| 26–27 (2)
| Dave Huckaba
| No Contest 
| Gladiator Challenge: Warpath
| 
| align=center| 1
| align=center| N/A
| Lincoln, California, United States
|Won the Gladiator Challenge Heavyweight Championship.
|-
| Loss
| align=center| 26–27 (1)
| Sean Loeffler
| KO (punch)
| Gladiator Challenge: MMA Smackdown
| 
| align=center| 1
| align=center| 0:04
| El Cajon, California, United States
|
|-
| Loss
| align=center| 26–26 (1)
| Ashley Gooch
| TKO (submission to punches)
| Duel for Domination 8
| 
| align=center| 1
| align=center| 0:29
| Mesa, Arizona, United States
| 
|-
| Loss
| align=center| 26–25 (1)
| Dan Huber
| Submission (verbal)
| Rage In The Cage 170
| 
| align=center| 1
| align=center| 0:52
| Phoenix, Arizona, United States
| 
|-
| Win
| align=center| 26–24 (1)
| Adrian Perez
| TKO (punches)
| Gladiator Challenge: Summer Heat
| 
| align=center| 1
| align=center| 0:23
| San Jacinto, California, United States
| 
|-
| Loss
| align=center| 25–24 (1)
| Joe Riggs
| Submission (armbar)
| Rage in the Cage 159
| 
| align=center| 2
| align=center| 1:18
| Chandler, Arizona, United States
| 
|-
| Loss
| align=center| 25–23 (1)
| Julian Hamilton
| Submission (rear-naked choke)
| Rage in the Cage 158
| 
| align=center| 2
| align=center| 2:15
| Chandler, Arizona, United States
| 
|-
| Win
| align=center| 25–22 (1)
| Jesse Varela
| Submission (rear-naked choke)
| TCF: Rumble at the Ranch 1
| 
| align=center| 1
| align=center| 2:04
| Phoenix, Arizona, United States
| 
|-
| Loss
| align=center| 24–22 (1)
| Shawn Frye
| Submission (rear-naked choke)
| Rage in the Cage 151
| 
| align=center| 1
| align=center| 2:01
| Chandler, Arizona, United States
| 
|-
| Win
| align=center| 24–21 (1)
| Larry Robertson
| TKO (submission to punches)
| Rage in the Cage 150
| 
| align=center| 1
| align=center| 0:55
| Chandler, Arizona, United States
| 
|-
| Loss
| align=center| 23–21 (1)
| Brad Peterson
| Submission (armbar)
| Rage in the Cage 149
| 
| align=center| 1
| align=center| 2:50
| Chandler, Arizona, United States
| 
|-
| Loss
| align=center| 23–20 (1)
| Vitor Vianna
| TKO (punches)
| Millennium Events: MMA Xplosion
| 
| align=center| 1
| align=center| 1:17
| Las Vegas, Nevada, United States
| 
|-
| Win
| align=center| 23–19 (1)
| Dan Quinn
| TKO (doctor stoppage)
| Gladiator Challenge: Fahrenheit
| 
| align=center| 2
| align=center| 0:22
| San Jacinto, California, United States
| 
|-
| Loss
| align=center| 22–19 (1)
| Travis Browne
| KO (punches)
| Gladiator Challenge: Vision Quest
| 
| align=center| 1
| align=center| 0:35
| San Jacinto, California, United States
| 
|-
| Win
| align=center| 22–18 (1)
| Lloyd Marshbanks
| TKO (corner stoppage)
| MMA Xtreme 9
| 
| align=center| 2
| align=center| N/A
| Tijuana, Mexico
| 
|-
| Loss
| align=center| 21–18 (1)
| Sherman Pendergarst
| Submission (rear-naked choke)
| PF 2: Live MMA
| 
| align=center| 1
| align=center| 0:54
| Hollywood, California, United States
| 
|-
| Win
| align=center| 21–17 (1)
| Adam Nance
| KO (punches)
| LA EFN: Executive Fight Night
| 
| align=center| 1
| align=center| N/A
| N/A
| 
|-
| Loss
| align=center| 20–17 (1)
| Eli Joslin
| Submission (guillotine choke)
| KOTC: Heavy Hitters
| 
| align=center| 1
| align=center| 1:52
| Coarsegold, California, United States
| 
|-
| Loss
| align=center| 20–16 (1)
| Buckley Acosta
| KO (punch)
| KOTC 63: Final Conflict
| 
| align=center| 1
| align=center| 0:10
| San Jacinto, California, United States
| 
|-
| Loss
| align=center| 20–15 (1)
| Robert Beraun
| KO (punches)
| RITC 76: Hello Tucson
| 
| align=center| 2
| align=center| 2:04
| Arizona, United States
| 
|-
| Loss
| align=center| 20–14 (1)
| Richard Montoya
| Submission (guillotine choke)
| KOTC: Execution Day
| 
| align=center| 1
| align=center| 1:55
| Reno, Nevada, United States
| 
|-
| Loss
| align=center| 20–13 (1)
| Fabiano Scherner
| Submission (guillotine choke)
| IFC: Rock N' Rumble
| 
| align=center| 1
| align=center| 0:50
| Reno, Nevada, United States
| 
|-
| Win
| align=center| 20–12 (1)
| John Meirzwa
| TKO (injury)
| Universal Above Ground Fighting
| 
| align=center| 1
| align=center| N/A
| California, United States
| 
|-
| Loss
| align=center| 19–12 (1)
| Mike Whitehead
| Decision (unanimous)
| UAGF: Clover Combat
| 
| align=center| 3
| align=center| 5:00
| California, United States
| 
|-
| Win
| align=center| 19–11 (1)
| Jeff Ford
| TKO (submission to punches and elbows)
| Venom: First Strike
| 
| align=center| 1
| align=center| 1:47
| Huntington Beach, California, United States
| 
|-
| Win
| align=center| 18–11 (1)
| Cory Timmerman
| TKO (submission to punches)
| RITC 60: 'The Saint' Goes Marching In
| 
| align=center| 1
| align=center| 1:05
| Phoenix, Arizona, United States
| 
|-
| Win
| align=center| 17–11 (1)
| Melville Calabaca
| Submission (rear-naked choke)
| ECS: Evolution
| 
| align=center| 1
| align=center| 0:33
| Phoenix, Arizona, United States
| 
|-
| Loss
| align=center| 16–11 (1)
| Wade Shipp
| TKO (submission to strikes)
| Hitman Fighting Productions 3
| 
| align=center| N/A
| align=center| N/A
| Santa Ana, California, United States
| 
|-
| Loss
| align=center| 16–10 (1)
| Andy Montana
| Submission (armbar)
| RITC 47: Unstoppable
| 
| align=center| 2
| align=center| 1:40
| Phoenix, Arizona, United States
| 
|-
| Loss
| align=center| 16–9 (1)
| Alistair Overeem
| Submission (guillotine choke)
| 2H2H 6: Simply the Best 6
| 
| align=center| 1
| align=center| 0:53
| Rotterdam, South Holland, Netherlands
| 
|-
| Win
| align=center| 16–8 (1)
| Allan Sullivan
| KO (punch)
| CFM: Cage Fighting Monterrey
| 
| align=center| 1
| align=center| N/A
| Monterrey, Mexico
| 
|-
| Win
| align=center| 15–8 (1)
| Mike Bourke
| TKO (punches)
| HFP 2: Hitman Fighting Productions 2
| 
| align=center| 1
| align=center| 0:27
| Santa Ana, California, United States
| 
|-
| Loss
| align=center| 14–8 (1)
| Jeremy Horn
| Submission (rear-naked choke)
| WEC 4: Rumble Under the Sun
| 
| align=center| 1
| align=center| 0:54
| Uncasville, Connecticut, United States
| 
|-
| Win
| align=center| 14–7 (1)
| Valentijn Overeem
| TKO (punches)
| WFA 2: Level 2
| 
| align=center| 1
| align=center| 2:24
| Las Vegas, Nevada, United States
| 
|-
| Win
| align=center| 13–7 (1)
| Zane Frazier
| TKO (punches)
| WEC 3: All or Nothing
| 
| align=center| 1
| align=center| 1:00
| Lemoore, California, United States
| 
|-
| Win
| align=center| 12–7 (1)
| Curtis Crawford
| TKO (punches)
| HFP 1: Rumble on the Reservation
| 
| align=center| 1
| align=center| 2:16
| Anza, California, United States
| 
|-
| Win
| align=center| 11–7 (1)
| Vaughan Palelei
| KO (punches)
| UA 1: The Genesis
| 
| align=center| 1
| align=center| 1:33
| Hammond, Indiana, United States
| 
|-
| Loss
| align=center| 10–7 (1)
| Wesley Correira
| TKO (punches)
| Shogun 1: Shogun 1
| 
| align=center| 1
| align=center| 1:08
| Honolulu, Hawaii, United States
| 
|-
| Loss
| align=center| 10–6 (1)
| Harout Terzyan
| Submission (armbar)
| UP 1: Ultimate Pankration 1
| 
| align=center| 1
| align=center| 3:23
| Cabazon, California, United States
| 
|-
| Win
| align=center| 10–5 (1)
| Frank Blessing
| KO (punches)
| GC 6: Caged Beasts
| 
| align=center| 1
| align=center| 0:50
| Colusa, California, United States
| 
|-
| Loss
| align=center| 9–5 (1)
| Bazigit Atajev
| KO (spinning back kick)
| Rings: 10th Anniversary
| 
| align=center| 1
| align=center| 1:09
| Tokyo, Japan
| 
|-
| Win
| align=center| 9–4 (1)
| Dennis Taddio
| TKO (punches)
| IFC WC 14: Warriors Challenge 14
| 
| align=center| 1
| align=center| 0:29
| California, United States
| 
|-
| NC
| align=center| 8–4 (1)
| Rich Franklin
| No Contest (accidental foot injury)
| IFC WC 11: Warriors Challenge 11
| 
| align=center| 1
| align=center| N/A
| Fresno, California, United States
| 
|-
| Loss
| align=center| 8–4
| Andrei Arlovski
| Submission (armbar)
| UFC 28: High Stakes
| 
| align=center| 1
| align=center| 0:55
| Atlantic City, New Jersey, United States
| 
|-
| Win
| align=center| 8–3
| Brian Tolbert
| TKO (punches)
| IFC WC 10: Warriors Challenge 10
| 
| align=center| 1
| align=center| 0:56
| Friant, California, United States
| 
|-
| Win
| align=center| 7–3
| Jason Jones
| TKO (punches)
| IFC WC 10: Warriors Challenge 10
| 
| align=center| 1
| align=center| 1:55
| Friant, California, United States
| 
|-
| Loss
| align=center| 6–3
| Bobby Hoffman
| TKO (submission to punches)
| Rings USA: Rising Stars Final
| 
| align=center| 1
| align=center| 1:34
| Moline, Illinois, United States
| 
|-
| Win
| align=center| 6–2
| Tommy Sauer
| TKO (punches)
| Rings USA: Rising Stars Final
| 
| align=center| 2
| align=center| 4:29
| Moline, Illinois, United States
| 
|-
| Win
| align=center| 5–2
| Art Hughes
| KO
| CFF: The Cobra Classic 2000
| 
| align=center| 1
| align=center| 0:46
| Anza, California, United States
| 
|-
| Loss
| align=center| 4–2
| Bobby Hoffman
| Submission (neck crank)
| Rings USA: Rising Stars Block A
| 
| align=center| 1
| align=center| 3:12
| Orem, Utah, United States
| 
|-
| Win
| align=center| 4–1
| Harry Moskowitz
| TKO (punches)
| Rings USA: Rising Stars Block A
| 
| align=center| 1
| align=center| 0:47
| Orem, Utah, United States
| 
|-
| Loss
| align=center| 3–1
| Gan McGee
| TKO (submission to punches)
| CFF: The Cobra Challenge 1999
| 
| align=center| 1
| align=center| 3:09
| Anza, California, United States
| 
|-
| Win
| align=center| 3–0
| Al Harlow
| KO
| WCNHBC: West Coast NHB Championships 3
| 
| align=center| N/A
| align=center| N/A
| Los Angeles, California, United States
| 
|-
| Win
| align=center| 2–0
| Al Harlow
| KO (knee)
| WCNHBC: West Coast NHB Championships 1
| 
| align=center| 1
| align=center| 1:24
| Los Angeles, California, United States
| 
|-
| Win
| align=center| 1–0
| Ali Afra
| KO (punches)
| WCNHBC: West Coast NHB Championships 1
| 
| align=center| 1
| align=center| 0:54
| Los Angeles, California, United States
|

Bare knuckle record

|- 
|Lose
|align=center|0–1
|Mike Bissett
|KO (punches)
|BKFC 3: The Takeover
|
|align=center|1
|align=center|1:21
|Biloxi, Mississippi, USA
|

See also
List of male mixed martial artists

References

External links
 
 
 

1974 births
Living people
American male mixed martial artists
Light heavyweight mixed martial artists
Heavyweight mixed martial artists
Mixed martial artists utilizing boxing
Ultimate Fighting Championship male fighters
Mixed martial artists from California
American male boxers
Bare-knuckle boxers 
Boxers from California
American male pornographic film actors
Pornographic film actors from California
People from Roseville, California